"Back in My Life" is a song by Dutch musical group Alice DeeJay and produced by Wessel van Diepen, Dennis van den Driesschen, Sebastiaan Molijn and Eelke Kalberg (Pronti & Kalmani). It was released in 1999 as the second single from the album, Who Needs Guitars Anyway?. The song reached number one in Norway and the top 10 in Finland, Ireland, Netherlands, Sweden, and the United Kingdom.

Release
"Back in My Life" was released in the United Kingdom on 29 November 1999. There are two music videos: one that has full funeral scenes, and one on a cliff top that has more dancing scenes.

Chart performance
"Back In My Life" was almost as successful as "Better Off Alone" in certain countries. It reached number one in Norway and number 27 on the US Hot Dance Club Songs chart. The single also performed well in the United Kingdom, peaking at number four in November 1999 and reaching number two in Scotland.

Track listing
CD maxi - Europe
 "Back in My Life" (Hitradio Full Vocal) - 3:25
 "Back in My Life" (Pronti & Kalmani Club Dub) - 6:04
 "Back in My Life" (DJ Jam X & De Leon's DuMonde Mix) - 6:58
 "Back in My Life" (Extended Hitradio Full Vocal) - 5:35
 "Back in My Life" (Extended Hitradio Instrumental) - 5:35

Charts

Weekly charts

Year-end charts

Certifications

Release history

References

1999 singles
1999 songs
Alice Deejay songs
Number-one singles in Norway
Positiva Records singles
Republic Records singles